This is a following list of the Namibian flags.

National flag and state flag

Governmental flag

Military flags

Flags of bantustans in South West Africa
Some of the bantustans established by South Africa during its period of administering South West Africa had adopted their own distinctive flags whilst others used the flag of South Africa.

Political flags

Historical flags

German Empire (1884-1915)

U.K. and South Africa  (1878–1990)

See also 

 Flag of Namibia
 Coat of arms of Namibia

References 

Flags of Namibia
Lists and galleries of flags
Flags